Rietz-Neuendorf is a municipality in the Oder-Spree district, in Brandenburg, Germany

Nearby are the Dubrower Berge a range of wooded hills popular with hikers and cyclists.

Climate 
The city experiences a degraded oceanic climate, common in the border of Germany-Poland (Köppen: Cfb). But due to its location to the east and interior (much more than most German cities), the climate is semicontinental, approaching Dfb, characterized for this using old normals and 0 °C isotherm.

The climate is similar with the south coast of Massachusetts (not island) where the strong continental influence is moderated by the sea, but still possessing extremes (hot summers but not above the pleasant threshold and cold winters with several days below zero but without the Arctic outbreaks). The west winds are weakened in their position in Central Europe, but more humid and hotter subtropics can still advance, making the city have four defined seasons of the year. The ecology of the area is the fruit of the mix of influences that sweep the eastern half of Germany, half west of Poland and the southernmost tip of Scandinavia.

Demography

References

External links 

Localities in Oder-Spree